Ediofe Hills FC is a football club in Arua, Uganda. 

They played a single season in the top level of Ugandan professional football, the Ugandan Super League, in 2007-08.

References

External links

Football clubs in Uganda
Northern Region, Uganda